Lucy (Korean: 루시) is a South Korean band formed during JTBC's television talent show titled Superband in 2019. The band finished in second place in the competition. After the competition, Lee Joo-hyuk was replaced by Choi Sang-yeop. Lucy joined Mystic Entertainment, represented by Yoon Jong-shin. They released their debut single, "Dear." on May 8, 2020.

Members 

 Shin Ye-chan - leader, violinist
 Choi Sang-yeop - vocalist, guitarist
 Cho Won-sang - producer, bassist
 Shin Gwang-il - vocalist, drummer

Originally, Lee Ju-hyuk was a vocalist of the band during Superband, but he decided to return to his original band, GIFT, after the show ended.

Name 
The group's name originates from the dog that resided where Wonsang's studio was during Superband. However, Gwang-il also explained that Lucy also comes from the Latin "lux" meaning light.

Discography

Studio albums

Extended plays

Single albums

Singles

Remake

OSTs

Filmography

Television shows

Notes

References 

South Korean rock music groups
Musical groups established in 2019
2019 establishments in South Korea